This is a list of hillside letters (also known as mountain monograms) in the U.S. state of Nevada. There are at least 47 hillside letters, acronyms, and messages in the state, with possibly many more.  The largest concentration is in the Carson City/Reno region.

Sources

External links

Mountain Monograms, a website explaining the origins and with an incomplete list and pictures
Hillside Letters, a companion website to a book on the subject
Letters on Hills, a category on waymarking.com for geocachers
Nevada's Hillside Letters, a Google map showing most hillside letters in Nevada

Hill figures in the United States
Lists of public art in the United States